The 2007–08 Eastern Michigan Eagles men's basketball team represented Eastern Michigan University during the 2007–08 NCAA Division I men's basketball season. The Eagles, led by 3rd year head coach Charles E. Ramsey, played their home games at the Eastern Michigan University Convocation Center and were members of the West Division of the Mid-American Conference. They finished the season 14–17, 8–8 in MAC play. They team finished 2nd in the MAC West. They were knocked out in the 2nd round of the MAC Tournament by Western Michigan. The team captains were Carlos Medlock, Travis Lewis and Jesse Bunkley.

Roster

Source:

Coaching staff

Schedule

Source:

Awards
All-MAC Honorable Mention
 Carlos Medlock  
MAC Player of the Week
 Nov. 13,2007 Carlos Medlock
Texas A&M Corpus Christi Islander Invitational
 Carlos Medlock

References

Eastern Michigan Eagles men's basketball seasons
Eastern Michigan
2007 in sports in Michigan
2008 in sports in Michigan